Andrew M. Stuart  is a British mathematician, working in applied and computational mathematics. In particular his research has focused on the numerical analysis of dynamical systems, applications of stochastic ordinary and partial differential equations, Bayesian approaches to inverse problems, and data assimilation.

Education 
Andrew Stuart graduated in Mathematics from Bristol University in 1983, and then obtained his DPhil from the Oxford University Computing Laboratory in 1986.

Career and research
After postdoctoral research in applied mathematics at MIT, Stuart held permanent positions at the University of Bath (1989–1992), in mathematics, at Stanford University (1991–1999), in engineering, and at Warwick University (1999–2016), in mathematics. He is currently a Professor in Computing and Mathematical Sciences at the California Institute of Technology.

Honours and awards
He has won numerous awards, including the 1989 Leslie Fox Prize for Numerical Analysis, the Monroe H. Martin Prize from the Institute for Physical Science and Technology at the University of Maryland, College Park, the SIAM James Wilkinson Prize, the Germund Dahlquist Prize in 1997, the Whitehead Prize from the London Mathematical Society in 2000, and the J.D. Crawford Prize in 2007. He has been an invited speaker at the International Council for Industrial and Applied Mathematics (ICIAM) in Zurich, 2007, and at the International Congress of Mathematicians (ICM) in Seoul, 2014.

In 2020 he was elected a Fellow of the Royal Society.

Bibliography 
In addition to mathematics research published in archival journals, Stuart is also the author of several books in mathematics, including a research monograph concerning Dynamical Systems and Numerical Analysis, a research text on Multiscale Methods, a graduate text on Continuum Mechanics, and a research text on Data Assimilation.

References

External links
 Web page at Warwick University
 
SIAM Germund Dahlquist Prize
SIAM James Wilkinson Prize
IPST Awards
LMS Whitehead Prize
ICIAM
Collaborators
Postdoctoral Fellows
Ph.D. Students

1962 births
Living people
Alumni of the University of Oxford
20th-century British mathematicians
21st-century British mathematicians
Stanford University School of Engineering faculty
Fellows of the Society for Industrial and Applied Mathematics
Fellows of the Royal Society